Cornelius Fitzgerald (2 August 1872 – 14 December 1953) was an Irish Gaelic footballer. His championship career with the Limerick senior team lasted several seasons in the 1890s.

Fitzgerald had his greatest success on the inter-county scene with Limerick during the 1896 championship. He captained the team that year and won his sole All-Ireland medal that year as Limerick defeated Louth in the final. Fitzgerald also won a Munster medal that year.

Honours

Limerick
All-Ireland Senior Football Championship (1): 1896 (c)
Munster Senior Football Championship (1): 1896 (c)

References

1872 births
1953 deaths
Commercials (Limerick) Gaelic footballers
Limerick inter-county Gaelic footballers